Certified Credit Professional (CCP) is the Canadian designation awarded to professionals in the credit management field by the Credit Institute of Canada (CIC). A CCP designation holder is a member of the Credit Institute of Canada and is bound by that organization's Code of Ethics. The CCP designation was formerly known as the FCI, Fellow Credit Institute. Professional designation for credit management was instituted in Canada in 1929.

Credit Institute of Canada

The Credit Institute of Canada (CIC) is a non-profit professional association created by an Act of Parliament on June 11, 1928. The CIC provides credit management resources, education and certification to its members and is the organization that grants official designations to professionals in the credit management field in Canada.

Education
The CCP designation is awarded to members of the Credit Institute of Canada who have acquired the required education and work experience. The Certified Credit Professional (CCP) Designation indicates that the individual has measureable knowledge of the skills required for a role in credit management. Education focuses on in-depth credit management courses supplemented by core education in accounting, economics, communications, law, finance and management information systems. The CCP Program is most commonly delivered through distance learning systems with support from internet based discussion boards. In-class alternatives are available in some regions. Experience requirements include a minimum of five years of work experience in a credit position. Maintenance of the CCP designation requires professional development that is reported to and tracked by the CIC.

The CIC has partnerships with CGA-Canada and the Canadian Construction Association.

Several Canadian post-secondary institutions recognize CCP designation and deliver programs that satisfy the educational requirement of CCP designation. University of Toronto, McMaster University, Simon Fraser University, Southern Alberta Institute of Technology, Northern Alberta Institute of Technology, and Fanshaw College.

Professional Development Program
Participation in the Professional Development Program is mandatory for all CCP designated members of the Credit Institute of Canada.

See also
Credit Institute of Canada

References

http://www.cga-canada.org/en-ca/Programs/Pages/ProfessionalPartnerships.aspx

External links
 Official Website of the Credit Institute of Canada

Professional certification in finance

 Certified Credit Professional Resource Material